There have been numerous assassination attempts on prime ministers of India. The prime minister is the executive head of the Union Government of India, and is usually the most powerful person in the country.

Two prime ministers, namely Indira Gandhi and Rajiv Gandhi (former prime minister) have been assassinated.

Assassinated prime ministers

Assassination attempts and plots

Jawaharlal Nehru 
 1947: Assassination attempt (as head of the Interim Government) during the partition of India while he was visiting the North-West Frontier Province in a car.
 4 May 1953: An alleged attempt to bomb the Bombay–Amritsar Express in which Nehru was travelling was thwarted when the police discovered two men crouched near the railway tracks in Kalyan, Bombay State. It was later discovered that the object initially thought of as a bomb was a firecracker and the attackers had only intended to cause a sensation.
30 September 1961: A failed bombing attempt on train tracks in Maharashtra on a route to be followed by the Prime Minister.

Rajiv Gandhi 

 14 May 1985: 2 Sikh men in the United States hid in a tree for 3 days but were foiled by the FBI.
16 June 1986: 4 Sikhs were jailed for trying to assassinate Gandhi in Leicester.
2 October 1986: Karamjit Singh, a Sikh gunman, fired rounds from an improvised, homemade firearm at Gandhi in Delhi, while he was leaving the Raj Ghat.
 30 July 1987  A Sri Lankan Navy sailor Wijemuni Vijitha Rohana de Silva hit Gandhi with his rifle butt in Colombo, while he was inspecting Guard of Honour at the Sri Lankan President’s House at Colombo.

See also 
List of assassinations in Asia#India
List of assassinated Indian politicians
Assassination of Mahatma Gandhi
2013 Patna bombings, targeting a rally of then prime ministerial candidate Narendra Modi

References 

India
Lists relating to prime ministers of India
Assassinations in India
Lists of events in India
Lists of Indian people
Lists of survivors
Lists of victims of crimes
India